A Fine Dark Line is a 2002 novel by American writer Joe R. Lansdale. The story is set in Dumont, Texas, in 1958. This novel was issued as a limited edition by Subterranean Press and as a trade hardcover and a trade paperback by Mysterious Press. Both hardcover editions are now out of print. A trade paperback was published by Mysterious Press on October 1, 2003.

Plot summary
The story is told through the eyes of Stanley Mitchell, a thirteen-year-old boy, the younger of two children. The Mitchells are the owners and proprietors of the only drive-in theater in Dumont. Stanley discovers a tin box containing a collection of troubled love letters that ultimately lead him to a burned-out house, the mysterious deaths of two young women and various secrets that the Dumont leaders would prefer remain buried. Stanley's ally is Buster Smith, the projectionist at the drive-in theater, an elderly black man whose attempts to drown his demons in alcohol are doomed to failure, but who has a depth that only Stanley is aware of. In attempting to solve the mysteries of the deaths of the two women, Stanley exposes himself, his family and his friends, to danger.

References

External links

 Author's Official Website

Novels by Joe R. Lansdale
2002 American novels

Fiction set in 1958
American mystery novels
Novels set in Texas
King County, Texas
Works by Joe R. Lansdale
Novels about racism
Subterranean Press books